Agleh Bachay (also Romanized as ‘Agleh Bachāy; also known as ‘Agal Bechāy, ‘Aglah Bachchāy, and ‘Agleh Bāchchāy) is a village in Azadeh Rural District, Moshrageh District, Ramshir County, Khuzestan Province, Iran. At the 2006 census, its population was 140, in 19 families.

References 

Populated places in Ramshir County